Hans Drachsler (10 March 1916 in Pleš (Bělá nad Radbuzou) – 18 October 1996 in Munich) was a German politician, representative of the Christian Social Union of Bavaria.

He was a member of the Landtag of Bavaria between 1970 and 1978, and was a member of the Bundestag.

See also
List of Bavarian Christian Social Union politicians

References

Christian Social Union in Bavaria politicians
1916 births
1996 deaths
Commanders Crosses of the Order of Merit of the Federal Republic of Germany
People from Domažlice District
Sudeten German people